Several vessels of the Royal Navy have borne the name HMS Pigeon.

  was the ex-mercantile Fanny, purchased in May 1805 and fitted and armed as a dispatch cutter. She was wrecked three quarters of a mile from the town of Rysum in East Friesland in November 1805 through the inexperience of her pilot.
  was a  launched in 1806 and wrecked off Margate in 1809.
Pigeon: See .
  was the mercantile wood paddle tender Brothers purchased at Constantinople in 1854 and sold there in 1856.
  was a wood screw  built in 1860 and broken up in 1876.
  was a composite screw gunboat built in 1888 and sold in 1906. 
  was an  built in 1916 and sold in 1921.

References
 

Royal Navy ship names